Sarkies is a surname. Notable people with the surname include:

 Sarkies Brothers, hoteliers
 Duncan Sarkies, New Zealand screenwriter and playwright
 Kristian Sarkies (born 1986), Australian soccer player
 Robert Sarkies (born 1967), New Zealand film director and screenwriter

See also
 Sarkis (disambiguation)